Rah-e-Farda (Radio & Television) is a radio and television network channel in Kabul, Afghanistan. This TV founded by Muhammad Mohaqiq and head of the TV is Mohaqiq and TV producer is Laal Mohammad Alizada.

See also 
 Television in Afghanistan
 Tolo TV

References

External links 
 www.farda.af
 zzday.info/farda.af
 sat-address.com/en/af/Rah-e-Farda
 lievjournal.com/info/farda.af
 عودة القناة من جديد 

Television in Afghanistan
Hazaragi-language mass media
Hazaragi-language television stations
Mass media in Kabul